is a Japanese female badminton player.

Achievements

BWF International Challenge/Series
Women's Doubles

 BWF International Challenge tournament
 BWF International Series tournament
 BWF Future Series tournament

References

External links
 

Japanese female badminton players
1990 births
Living people
Sportspeople from Hiroshima Prefecture